The list of shipwrecks in 1881 includes ships sunk, foundered, grounded, or otherwise lost during 1881.

January

February

March

April

May

June

July

August

September

October

November

December

Ụ==Unknown date==

References

1881